The Capivari River is a Brazilian river in the state of Minas Gerais.  Its source in the Serra da Chapada das Perdizes is located in Carrancas.  The river has dozens of waterfalls along its course to its discharge into the Grande River.  It passes through the municipalities of Itumirim and Lavras.

See also
 List of rivers of Minas Gerais

References
 IBGE physical map of Minas Gerais

Rivers of Minas Gerais